Robert Kronenberg (born March 11, 1971) is an American football coach and former player who is currently the assistant offensive line coach for the Atlanta Falcons of the National Football League (NFL). Kronenberg played in the Canadian Football League, NFL Europe and the Arena Football League.
In 2004, Kronenberg was the head coach of the Georgia Force.

References

External links
 Atlanta Falcons bio

1971 births
Living people
American football centers
St. Cloud State Huskies football players
Las Vegas Posse players
Rhein Fire players
Toronto Argonauts players
Nashville Kats players
Georgia Force coaches
Atlanta Falcons scouts